100% Love is the film soundtrack of the 2011 romance film of the same name directed by Sukumar which starred Naga Chaitanya and Tamannaah. The music and background score was composed by Sukumar's regular associate Devi Sri Prasad. The album consisted on 8 songs which included 2 bit songs in the first release and 2 another bit songs in the next release. Chandrabose, Ramajogayya Sastry and Sri Mani penned the Lyrics. The album was released on 2 April 2011 at Rock Gardens in Hyderabad on Aditya Music label. Upon release, 100% Love received positive response from critics.

Track listing

Reception
The album received positive response from the critics.

123telugu.com gave a review stating "On the whole 100% Love has got a very appealing mix of numbers even though it doesn't have a proper love song. The first three songs, along with Swathi's number definitely deserve mention. While the newness is quite appreciable, it seems the album will take some time to sink in, having only college going students as its main target." IndiaGlitz gave a review stating "Devi Sri Prasad is known for giving fantastic rock songs. This time, he scored good marks not only in giving rock music but also melodious tunes to some of the songs and the album has every chance of becoming a good hit and the film would become a musical hit because of the songs. Chandrabose, Ramajogayya Sastry and Sri Mani gave excellent lyrics to all the songs and each song had very good rhythm and melody stuffed in them. Naga Chaitanya whose last film Ye Maaya Chesave was a hit and the audio album proves that he would bag another musical hit to Chaitu’s credit" and termed the Album contained "Cent per cent lovable tunes from Devi". way2movies.com gave a review stating "Well, Devi Sri Prasad has yet again proved with 100% Love that he always gives his 100% best to director Sukumar. 100% Love is pretty awesome album targeted on youth especially, the college going students. Go for it." Milliblog called the Album "A thoroughly engaging soundtrack from DSP". Raagalahari.com gave a review stating "This album tells that Devisri is remarkably creative, funny and very much in love with music. The duo, Sukumar-Devisri certainly knows the pulse of the urban youth and this album is yet another great attempt to grab the attention of the target audience. This ‘100% Love’ is 100% for the youth."

Awards and nominations

References

2011 soundtrack albums
Telugu film soundtracks
2010s film soundtrack albums
Aditya Music soundtracks
Devi Sri Prasad soundtracks